Matías Josiás Sosa (born 18 August 2001) is an Argentine professional footballer who plays as a striker for Atenas, on loan from Talleres.

Career
Sosa began with hometown team Club Social y Deportivo Arzeno, though would eventually depart to Temperley. He spent one year with Victoriano Arenas in 2016–17. After making his reserve debut back with Temperley in December 2017 against San Martín, the striker was promoted into the first-team in 2020 under Walter Perazzo. He made his senior debut on 30 November during a Primera Nacional home victory over Ferro Carril Oeste, as he replaced Lucas Baldunciel for the final eleven minutes. He appeared off the bench again on 6 December away to Agropecuario, before making his first start on 13 December at home to Estudinates.

On 23 February 2021, after seven matches for Temperley, Sosa was loaned to Primera División side Talleres; until the succeeding December, with a purchase option. Already in July 2021, Talleres decided to trigger the purchase option, meaning that Sosa would join the club permanently from 2022. In February 2022, Sosa was loaned out to Uruguayan Primera División club Atenas until the end of the year with a purchase option.

Career statistics
.

Notes

References

External links

2001 births
Living people
People from Burzaco
Argentine footballers
Argentine expatriate footballers
Association football forwards
Sportspeople from Buenos Aires Province
Primera Nacional players
Argentine Primera División players
Uruguayan Primera División players
Club Atlético Temperley footballers
Talleres de Córdoba footballers
Argentine expatriate sportspeople in Uruguay
Expatriate footballers in Uruguay